Niger's transport system was little developed during the colonial period (1899–1960), mainly relying upon animal, human, and limited river transport in the far southwest and southeast. No railways were constructed in the colonial period, and roads outside the capital remained unpaved. The Niger River is unsuitable for large-scale river transport, as it lacks depth for most of the year and is broken by rapids in many areas. Camel caravan transport was historically important in the Sahara desert and Sahel regions, which cover most of northern Niger.

Governance
Transport, including motor vehicles, highways, airports, and port authorities, is overseen by the Nigerien Ministry of Transport's Directorate for Land Water and Air Transport ("Ministère des Transport et de l'aviation civile/Direction des Transports Terrestres, Maritimes et Fluviaux"). Border controls and import/export duties are overseen by independent tax police, the "Police du Douanes.” Air traffic control is overseen and operated in conjunction with the pan-African ASECNA, which bases one of its five air traffic zones at Niamey's Hamani Diori International Airport.[1] A non-governmental body, the Nigerien Council of Users of Public Transport ("Conseil Nigérien des Utilisateurs des Transports Publics CNUT”) advocates on behalf of users of public transport, including roads and airports.[2]

Highways

Outside of cities, the first major paved roads were constructed between the northern town of Arlit to the Benin border in the 1970s and 1980s. This road, dubbed the Uranium Highway,[1] runs through Arlit, Agadez, Tahoua, Birnin-Konni, and Niamey, and is part of the Trans-Sahara Highway system.

An additional paved highway runs from Niamey via Maradi and Zinder towards Diffa in the far east of the nation, although the stretch from Zinder to Diffa is only partially paved. Portions of this route are used by the Trans-Sahel Highway route. The Niger section is 837 km long (of which 600 km were in poor condition as of 2000), via Niamey, Dosso, Dogondoutchi, Birnin-Konni, and Maradi to the Nigerian border at Jibiya.

Other roads range from all-weather laterite surfaces to grated dirt or sand Pistes, especially in the arid north.

The United States government in 1996 estimated there were a total of 10100 km of highways in Niger, with 798 km paved and 9302 km unpaved, but making no distinction between improved or all-weather roads and unimproved roads.[2] In 2012, there were 19,675 km (12,225 mi) of road network throughout Niger, of which only 4,225 km (2,625 mi) were paved.[3]

Routes Nationale
The national road system ("Routes Nationale") is numbered and prefixed with "RN”, as RN1. The numbering system contains routes or sections which are as yet unpaved or even unimproved tracks. Route Nationale no. 25, for example, is a major paved highway from Niamey to Filingué, follows the partially improved Route Nationale no. 26 towards Abala, veers off onto a dirt track (locally called a Piste) from the villages of Talcho to Sanam, where RN26 also terminates from another direction. RN25 then continues along a piste through a largely uninhabited desert for almost 100 km before reaching the city of Tahoua, served by other major paved roads. The main "Uranium Highway" then coincides with the RN25 to Arlit in the far north. Consequently, the informal names for the routes (e.g., "Uranium Highway") serve a somewhat more practical purpose than the RN numbers.[1] [2] [3]

Road transport
Nigerians in both urban and rural areas rely on a combination of motor vehicles and animals for the transport of themselves and commercial goods. Road transport is the major form of travel across the huge distances between Nigerian population centers, though most Nigerians do not own vehicles. In cities, public transport systems are largely absent, so a variety of privately operated services carry many urban dwellers. Vans, cars, motor coaches, trucks, and even converted motorbikes provide paid transport. Intercity coach systems are the standard form of personal transport, with the government operating one bus service (the SNTV) and a multitude of buses, "bush taxis" (taxi brousse), small vans, and semi-converted trucks taking passengers and goods. Services are sometimes scheduled from the "Highway stations" ("Gares routières") found in every town but are more frequently ad hoc: vehicles ply the trade between towns, picking up at stations or anywhere along the route, and departing only when full.[1]

Animals pulling wagons and loaded camel trains remain a common sight on Nigerian roads.[1]

Motor vehicle regulation
Vehicles in Niger are subject to the "Laws of the Road" ("Code de la route”), for which the government began a continuing reform in 2004-2006, which are based substantially on French models.[1] Vehicles travel on the right side of the road, and roads use French-style signage.[2] Routes Nationale is marked with the traditional French Milestones: a white tablet with a red top, marked with the route number. Vehicle owners must obtain a registration document (“carte grise") and vehicle license plates ("plaques d’immatriculation"), which are of similar manufacture to those in Guinea and Mali.[3] License plates usually contain the national code "RN" for international travel.[4] Niger is a signatory to the September 1949 Geneva Convention on Road Traffic and thus honors International drivers’ licenses from other signatories.[5] Drivers’ licenses are regulated through the national Ministry of Transport but issued by local officials.[6] Drivers must pass a driver’s test to qualify.[7]

A 2009 enforcement blitz in Niamey resulted in numerous arrests of owners of small motorbikes, common in Nigerien cities. One newspaper reported that most riders believed erroneously that there was no license or regulation required by law for motorbikes under 50cc in engine size, although these had been regulated in law since 2002 but not enforced.[8] Motorbikes are also common means of public transport in some Nigerien cities. These motorcycle "taxis motos", or "kabu kabu", are the primary form of taxis in cities like Zinder, Agadez, and Maradi. In Zinder, a 2009 local newspaper report claimed there were no more than "three to five" automobile taxis operating in a diffuse city, which subsequently relies upon the only partially regulated motorcycle taxi sector.[9]

Road safety
Road accidents have been identified as a major public health concern by the Nigerien government.  According to Chékarou Bagoudou, Chief of the Division of Road Safety and Security of the Nigerien Ministry of Transport, there were 4338 officially reported road accidents in 2008, with 7443 victims, of which 616 were killed. With the Nigerien government counting 18949 km of roads in the nation, this comes to one accident for every five kilometers in 2008. Speaking before a National Assembly session, Bagoudou said that the 42.2 billion CFA francs spent on medical costs for road accident victims accounted for around 25% of the 2008 budget of the Nigerien Ministry of Public Health. Transport figures concluded that 70% of road accidents were caused by "human factors", 23% by mechanical faults and 7% by road conditions.

Waterways

The Niger River is navigable 300 km from Niamey to Gaya on the Benin frontier from mid-December to March.  Thereafter, a series of falls and rapids rendered the Niger unnavigable in all seasons. In the navigable stretches, shallows prevent all but the small draft African canoes (Pirogues and Pinnases) from operating in many areas. As there is only one major bridge over the Niger (The Kennedy Bridge in Niamey: the Niger River bridge at Gaya crosses into Benin), car ferries are of crucial importance, especially the crossing at Bac Farie, 40 km north of Niamey on the RN4, and the car ferry at Ayorou.

Despite having no ocean or deep draft river ports, Niger does operate a ports authority. Niger relies on the port at Cotonou (Benin), and to a lesser degree Lomé (Togo), and Port Harcourt (Nigeria), as its main route to overseas trade. Abidjan was in the process of regaining Niger's port trade, following the disruption of the Ivorian Civil War, beginning in 1999. Niger operates a Nigerien Ports Authority station, as well as customs and tax offices in a section of Cotonou's port, so that imports and exports can be directly transported between Gaya and the port. French Uranium mines in Arlit, which produce Niger's largest exports by value, travel through this port to France or the world market.

Airports
The US government estimated there were 27 airports and/or landing strips in Niger as of 2007. Nine (9) of these had paved runways and 18 with unpaved landing strips.  ICAO Codes for Niger are prefixed "DR".

Of the 9 Airports with paved runways, 2 with paved strips from 2,438 to 3,047 m: Diori Hamani International Airport and Mano Dayak International Airport.  These are the only two Nigerien airports with regular international commercial flights. Six of the remainder have strips between 1,524 and 2,437 m, while one is under 914 m.  18 additional airports have unpaved runways 15 of them with strips between 914 and 1,523 m.

Major airports (with ICAO code and IATA code) include:
 DRRM (MFQ) – Maradi Airport – Maradi
 DRRN (NIM) – Diori Hamani International Airport – Niamey
 DRRT (THZ) – Tahoua Airport – Tahoua
 DRZA (AJY) – Mano Dayak International Airport – Agadez South
 DRZL (RLT) – Arlit Airport – Arlit
 DRZR (ZND) – Zinder Airport – Zinder
 DRZF – Diffa Airport – Diffa
 DRZD – Dirkou Airport – Dirkou
 DRRB (BKN) – Birni N'Konni Airport – Birni N'Konni

Other airstrips (with ICAO codes) include:
 DRRI Bilma
 DRRC Dogondoutchi
 DRRD Dosso
 DRRG Gaya
 DRZG Goure
 DRZI Iferouane
 DRRP La Tapoa
 DRZM Maine Soroa
 DRZN N'guigmi
 DRRU Ouallam
 DRZT Tanout
 DRRA Tessaoua
 DRRE Téra
 DRRL Tillabery
 DRRZ Tillia

Railway

Niger is a user of the Benin and Togo railway lines, which carry goods from seaports to the Niger border.  Rail lines to Niamey and other points in Niger were proposed during the colonial period, and continue to be discussed. In 2012, a multi-national railway system was proposed to connect Benin, Niger, Burkina Faso and Ivory Coast.

Other lines connecting Nigeria to Niger have also been discussed. For example, on 13 August 2013 in Nigeria, the Vice President of Nigeria, Namadi Sambo, announced that Nigeria is to construct a line into the Republic of Niger. The new track will be an extension of the existing branch from Zaria to Kaura-Namoda, which is to be continued via Sokoto to Birnin Kebbi. In the longer term it will extend the line across the border to Niamey, capital of Niger. The existing branch is currently out of commission, but rehabilitation has commenced.

In April 2014, Niamey Railway Station was officially inaugurated and construction began for the railway extension connecting Niamey to Cotonou via Parakou (Benin). This railway line is expected to go through Dosso city and Gaya in the territory of Niger before crossing into Benin. The Niamey–Dosso line is expected to be completed before December 2014.

See also 

 Geography of Niger
 Seasonal migration in Niger
 Railway stations in Niger
 Railway stations in Benin

References

 Jolijn Geels. Niger. Bradt UK/ Globe Pequot Press USA (2006) 
 Samuel Decalo. Historical Dictionary of Niger (3rd ed.). Scarecrow Press, Boston & Folkestone, (1997) 
 Abdou Bontianti et Issa Abdou Yonlihinza, La RN 6 : un exemple d’intégration économique sous-régionale et un facteur de désenclavement du Niger, Les Cahiers d’Outre-Mer, 241-242 January–June 2008. Retrieved 13 May 2009.

External links